Speed skating featured as part of the 2007 Asian Winter Games in the newly constructed Jilin Provincial Speed Skating Rink in Changchun. Ten medal events were contested, with the men's 10000 metres, a part of the Games since 1986, replaced by 100 metres for both genders. Events were held from 29 January to 1 February.

China won the most gold medals, taking five of the ten on offer, by sweeping the women's events. Wang Fei won two gold medals and one silver medal in the three longest distances, while Wang Beixing two gold medals and a silver medal in the three shortest. Japan won the shortest and the longest distance for men, through Yuya Oikawa and Hiroki Hirako, while Lee Kyou-hyuk and Lee Kang-seok of South Korea won the three middle distances.

Schedule

Medalists

Men

Women

Medal table

Participating nations
A total of 71 athletes from 6 nations competed in speed skating at the 2007 Asian Winter Games:

References
 2007 Winter Asiad sports schedule
 speedskatingresults.com

 
2007
2007 Asian Winter Games events
Asian Winter Games
International speed skating competitions hosted by China